KARG may refer to:

 KARG (FM), an American Family Radio affiliate (91.7 FM) licensed to serve Poteau, Oklahoma, United States
 Walnut Ridge Regional Airport in Walnut Ridge, Arkansas, United States, which is assigned ICAO code KARG